Sweat bee is a common name for various bees that are attracted to the salt in human sweat. It can refer to:

 Small bees in the family Halictidae, common across the world, particularly
 Agapostemon, Augochlora, Augochlorella, and Augochloropsis, metallic green sweat bees
 Lasioglossum and Halictus, black and white bees; two of the most abundant genera within the family Halictidae
 Less commonly, various stingless bees of the family Apidae:
 Plebeina armata, also called Mopane Fly, native to Africa
 Trigona, of the Americas

Animal common name disambiguation pages